The German-American Heritage Museum of the USA, or GAHM, is located in the Penn Quarter's Hockemeyer Hall in Washington D.C., the capital of the United States of America. The GAHM is sponsored by several German and American organizations. The museum, headquarters of the German-American Heritage Foundation of the USA, traces the 400-year long history of Germans in America from 1600 to now.

History

Hockemeyer Hall
John Hockemeyer was a German man who emigrated to the United States. After the Civil War, he became a wealthy merchant and a leader among Washington D.C.'s German community. In 1888, Hockemeyer constructed a Victorian townhouse that became a local center for the city's German-American business community and a meeting place for various German clubs and organizations, some of which Hockemeyer was a member of. In October 2008, the German-American Heritage Foundation of the USA purchased this building to establish the museum.

References

External links
 German-American Heritage Foundation of the USA official website

Ethnic museums in Washington, D.C.
German-American culture in Washington, D.C.
German-American museums
Museums of human migration